Hiroki Sanada (真田 裕貴, born February 7, 1984) is a professional baseball player from Takasago, Hyōgo, Japan (though was born in Osaka Prefecture). He began his career as a pitcher for the Yomiuri Giants and currently plays for the Tokyo Yakult Swallows. In November 2011, the Stars announced that they would use the posting system and auction Sanada's negotiating rights to Major League Baseball teams.

References

External links

1984 births
Living people
Baseball people from Hyōgo Prefecture
Baseball people from Osaka Prefecture
Japanese expatriate baseball players in Taiwan
Nippon Professional Baseball pitchers
Yomiuri Giants players
Yokohama BayStars players
Brother Elephants players
Tokyo Yakult Swallows players